Timothy John Adam Scriven (born 15 December 1965) played first-class cricket for Somerset in 1988 and 1989. Primarily a Minor Counties cricketer for Buckinghamshire, he played for Buckinghamshire between 1988 and 1999, in which he was very successful. Scriven also appeared in a first-class match for a Minor Counties cricket team in 1994. He was born at High Wycombe, Buckinghamshire.

A tall left-arm orthodox spin bowler and right-handed middle order batsman, Scriven had played  for Northamptonshire and Minor Counties cricket for Buckinghamshire before arriving at Somerset in 1988. In two seasons, he was given three first eleven matches and took two wickets in an innings. Five years after leaving Somerset, he played a  first-class match for the Minor Counties team against the 1994 South Africans and took three wickets for 43 runs in the tourists' first innings, the best figures of his first-class career. In nine List A matches for Buckinghamshire in the NatWest Trophy between 1988 and 1999, his best bowling was three for 61 in 12 overs in the match against Surrey in 1998.

References

1965 births
Living people
English cricketers
Somerset cricketers
Buckinghamshire cricketers
Buckinghamshire cricket captains
Minor Counties cricketers